Qiu Xiaofei (born 1977, Heilongjiang, China) is a contemporary Chinese artist.

Education
Qiu studied at the Central Academy of Fine Arts (中央美术学院) in Beijing and received a Bachelor of Fine Arts in oil painting in 1998 and Graduate from China Central Academy of Fine Arts in 2002. He now lives and works in Beijing, China.

Public exhibitions (parts)

Solo
2010 Point of No Return, Boers-Li gallery, Beijing, China.
2009 Invisible Journeys, Doosan Gallery, Seoul, Korea. 
2008 pagoda of the discarded, Art&Public gallery, Geneva, Switzerland.

Group
2012 Face, Minsheng Art Museum, Shanghai, China.
2012 Ministry of Truth, Boers-Li gallery, Beijing, China.
2011 MengLong－Oscurita, Collateral Events of the 54th International Art Exhibition, Venice Biennale 2011, Venice, Italy.
2011 In a Perfect World, Meulensteen Gallery, New York, U.S.A.
2011 Fly through the troposphere-Memo of the new generation painting, Iberia center for contemporary art, Beijing, China.
2010 Beijing Voice Annual Project, Pace Gallery/Beijing, Beijing, China.
2010 Negotiation-the second Today's Documents, Today Art Museum, Beijing, China.
2010 Thirty Year Journey of Chinese Contemporary Art, Minsheng Art Museum, Shanghai, China.
2009 Emporium-A New Common Sense of Space, The Science and Technology Museum of Leonardo da Vinci, Milan, Italy.
2009 10th Havana Biennial, Havana, Cuba.
2008 New world order, Groninger Museum, Groningen, The Netherlands.
2008 Art premier, 39th Art Basel 2008, Basel, Switzerland.
2008 Subtlety, Platform China, Beijing, China.
2007 The Real Thing, Tate Liverpool, Liverpool, Britain
2007 Thermocline of Art: New Asian Waves, ZKM Museum, Karlsruhe, Germany
2005 Mahjong-Contemporary Chinese Art from the Sigg Collection, Kunst Museum, Bern, Switzerland.
2005 Retrospective Exhibition of Chinese Oil Painting, National Art Museum of China, Beijing, China .

References

 "A Conversation with Hu Xiaoyuan and Qiu Xiaofei" Danielle Shang. Volume 8, Number 5, September/October 2009

External links
 Qiu Xiaofei's Artistic Time Warp [www.artzinechina.com]
 China Contemporary: Qiu Xiaofei [tudou.com]
 QIU XIAOFEI: POINT OF NO RETURN [艺术界LEAP]
 solo show [ARTSPY艺术眼]
 Article [Yishu online]

1977 births
Living people
Painters from Heilongjiang
Central Academy of Fine Arts alumni